"Six Significant Landscapes" is a poem from Wallace Stevens's first book of poetry, Harmonium. It was first published  in 1916, so it is in the public domain.

Each of these six landscapes of the imagination is a poem in its own right, each conveying an image, simply sculpted and precise, contributing to a pastiche effect. The first displays the influence of haiku and orientalism on Stevens, the second evokes the romantic mystery of night, the third is a wry comment about the duality of the human condition, the dream in the fourth bears comparison to Klee and Chagall, the fifth acknowledges the subtlety of nature, and the sixth associates this subtlety with a reality that evades a rationalist point of view. The sixth can also be understood as Stevens's gentle contribution to the ancient quarrel between philosophical reason and poetic imagination, recommending that philosophers trade in their square hats for sombreros. 
Buttel appreciates in the fourth landscape a hallucinatory effect such that "space shrinks, the imagination expands, and the illogical perspective surprises the reader into a recognition of heavenly grandeur". Apropos of the first landscape, he cites Earl Miner in support of the idea that "the objectivity, indirectness, and condensation of the haiku technique seem to have had a more beneficial and lasting effect on his style than the merely ornamental details of orientalism". Buttel reads the fifth landscape as a reaction against "Romantic softness" in favor of "hard clarity", in the spirit of Imagism. The poem's central symbol is not something beyond the poem or something merely intimated by it, but is rather in the star, in the manner that Ezra Pound and the Symbolists recommended.

Notes

References 
 Buttel, Robert. Wallace Stevens: The Making of Harmonium. Princeton University Press, 1967.

1916 poems
American poems
Poetry by Wallace Stevens